The University of Pisa (UniPi), officially founded in 1343, is one of the oldest universities in Europe.

History

The Origins 

The University of Pisa was officially founded in 1343, although various scholars place its origins in the 11th century. It is certain, however, that from the middle of the 12th century Pisa had a “Universitas” in the original sense of the word, that is, a group of students who gathered around masters. It was during this period that Leonardo Fibonacci was born and worked. He was one of the greatest mathematicians in history who, through his work, synthesized the spirit and processes of Greek geometry and the tools of Arabic mathematics for the first time in Europe.

The papal seal “In Supremae dignitatis”, issued by Pope Clement VI on 3 September 1343, granted the Studium in Pisa the title of Studium Generale with various exclusive privileges, making it universally recognised. In medieval times, the Studium Generale was a higher institute of education founded or confirmed by a universal authority, namely the papacy or the empire. Pisa was among the first European cities to vaunt a papal attestation, followed by Prague in 1347 and Heidelberg in 1386. At the outset in Pisa, lessons in Theology, Civil Law, Canon Law and Medicine were established.

The first years of the new Studium were particularly difficult, although there is documentary evidence that shows persistent academic activity with a slow recovery starting in 1355.

The end of the 14th century and the beginning of the 15th century saw Pisa and its Studium heading towards a slow death. The war, which had allowed the Florentines to conquer the city, was so socially and economically damaging that it made preserving even the most essential academic activity impossible.

The Medicis and Galileo 

During the first few days of November 1473, the Studium in Pisa began to develop systematically at the request of Lorenzo dei Medici. In 1486, the construction of a building specifically for lessons was commissioned: the building, the future Palazzo della Sapienza, still the centre of the present-day University, was placed in the 13th century Piazza del Grano, which could be reached through the gateway dell’Abbondanza. The image of the Cherub was placed above this gateway. In the Christian tradition, the Cherub represents an angelic being with a clearer vision of God, who in turn represents absolute knowledge. Since then, the Cherub has become the iconographic symbol of the University of Pisa and, in more recent times, the Order of the Cherub is awarded to members of the university teaching staff who have contributed to enhancing its prestige.

In 1497, the Pisan institute suffered a new period of decline and was moved to Florence for nine years. The rise to the throne of Duke Cosimo I dei Medici marked the beginning of a new era. The formal reopening of the university on 1 November 1543 was, in fact, considered to be a second founding. With the 1545 Statute, Cosimo managed to raise the quality of the teaching, making the University of Pisa one of the most important in Europe for both teaching and research. The Duke established the Chair of Simples (Semplici in Botany) and appointed Luca Ghini: between 1543 and 1544 the Garden of Simples was founded. This was the first botanical garden in the world annexed to a university Studium. A few decades later, the garden was moved to its present position a few dozen metres from Piazza dei Miracoli, covering an area of around three hectares with 6,000 cultivated plants and seeds exchanged with other 400 structures in the world. Ghini was succeeded by the philosopher and scientist Andrea Cesalpino, who created the first scientific method for the classification of plants and can be considered the forerunner of the discovery of the cardiovascular system.  

Cosimo I was still ruling when Galileo Galilei was born on 15 February 1564 in Pisa. Galileo Galilei is universally thought of as the founder of modern science and the modern experimental method. He was initially a student and then a teacher of Mathematics at the University of Pisa before moving to Padova. It was in the city in Tuscany that he began the studies and experiments which were the basis of his revolutionary theories.

The house of Lorraine 
The decline of the Grand Duchy of Tuscany (Medici), in the middle of the 18th century, saw the downfall of the Studium in Pisa, which only picked up again with the Lorraine dynasty. It was thanks to these enlightened innovators and reformers that numerous works and the establishment of the new Chairs of Experimental Physics and Chemistry were created.  

The annexation of Tuscany to the Napoleonic Empire at the beginning of the 19th century brought about the transformation of the Studium into an imperial Academy: the university became a subsidiary of the University of Paris, even though it managed to retain a certain degree of autonomy. At that time, five faculties (Theology, Law, Medicine, Science and Arts), exams, different academic qualifications (bachelor, master and doctoral degrees) and degree theses came into being. The Scuola Normale Superiore was established between 1810 and 1813. It started out as a subsidiary of the École Normale in Paris and closed immediately to be reopened in 1846 with the inauguration of its present seat at Palazzo della Carovana in Piazza dei Cavalieri.

Restoration and Risorgimento 

The period of the Restoration led to a reconsideration of the organisation within the Studium, but not to the complete revocation of the Napoleonic experience. In 1826, lessons on Egyptology were introduced at the University of Pisa. This was a first in Europe and the world in general, leading to the renowned French-Tuscan expedition to Egypt between 1828 and 1829. In 1839, Pisa hosted the first congress of Italian scientists, which saw the participation of over 400 scholars and 300 experts in the various branches of knowledge from different states of the peninsula. It was during this period that the university was at the centre of the reform called for by Provveditore Gaetano Giorgini, which saw the faculties increase in number to six (Theology, Law, Arts, Medicine, Mathematics and Natural Sciences) and for the first time in the world, the Chair of Agriculture and sheep-farming was created and entrusted to Cosimo Ridolfi.

In the university and in the city, liberal and patriotic ideals were coming to the fore and these reached their peak when teachers and students formed a university battalion and joined the battle of Curtatone and Montanara in 1848. This was one of the most significant battles in the Italian Risorgimento. A memorial plaque in Palazzo della Sapienza commemorates the volunteers who “died fighting for the rebirth of Italy”, while the Italian flag used by the university battalion was honoured with the gold military medal by the Italian Republic in 1948.

The kingdom of Italy 
With the creation of the Kingdom of Italy, the University of Pisa, which now counted around 560 matriculated students, re-emerged with all the faculties then present in the regulations and was acknowledged through the university reform of 1862, as one of the six principal national universities together with Turin, Pavia, Bologna, Naples and Palermo. The consolidation and expansion of the university, above all in the years straddling the 1800s and the 1900s, had a direct impact on the urban fabric development of the city even though the number of students increased only moderately (891 in 1912). The university gradually welcomed female students and in 1877, Ernestina Paper graduated in Medicine. She was the first woman to graduate from an Italian university and was followed by Cornelia Fabri in Mathematics and Erminia Pittaluga in Arts.

The reform called for by the minister Giovanni Gentile in 1923, further confirmed the university's prominent position at national level when it was placed among the ten universities totally funded by the state. Notwithstanding the aim to make Pisa a great “centre of university fascist culture” antifascist unrest was still alive, both in the academic community and among students. The application of racial laws, the first of which were signed by King Vittorio Emanuele III in 1938 at San Rossore, near Pisa, affected foreign and Italian students and university teachers severely, as was the case throughout Italy. It was not until 2018, in Pisa, 80 years after the signature, that there was an official and public admission of responsibility on behalf of the Italian universities (on the University of Pisa's own initiative).

The Republic 

The physical and moral destruction caused by the Second World War was soon overcome and the University of Pisa, whose matriculated students passed from 768 in 1945 to 1,292 in 1950, was able to lead the field in many areas of knowledge, adapting to the new demands of social, civil and economic life. The faculties of Economics and Business Studies (1948), and later Foreign Languages and Literature (1969) and Political Science (1970) joined the faculties present before the conflict – Engineering and Pharmacy –  and accompanied the arrival of the university for the masses (between 1961 and 1972 student numbers in Pisa went from around 9,000 to 27,000). At the start of the sixties, the University of Pisa established the first Italian Chair of Film History and Criticism. In 1969, the degree course in Computer Science (Informatics) was set up. It was the first in Italy and followed the creation of the Pisan Electronic Calculator (CEP), designed in the mid-1950s and sponsored by Nobel Prize winner and graduate of the University of Pisa, Enrico Fermi, which was the basis for other firsts in Italy in its field. In 1986, for example, the first Italian link to the Internet originated in Pisa.  

In 1967, the merger of the pre-existing colleges led to the creation of the Sant’Anna School of Advanced Studies and the Scuola Normale Superiore, forming a system of further education which is of the highest prestige at international level.

Also in 1967, during a period of protests, the “Tesi della Sapienza”, one of the milestones of the 1968 student movement in Italy, were compiled in Pisa. This phase of the unrest was particularly animated in the city with some dramatic moments.

From the end of the 1970s, the University's Natural History Museum moved to the enchanting 14th century Charterhouse of Calci, a building of priceless historic and architectural worth. The museum houses numerous rooms dedicated to zoology, mineralogy and palaeontology as well as Italy's largest freshwater aquarium and Whale gallery with more than thirty whale skeletons exhibited in an ancient portico.

UniPi today 

The Ruberti reform of 1989, which envisaged the statutory autonomy of universities, forced the university to approve a new Statute, whose overall structure was only called into question with the so-called “Gelmini reform” in 2010. This led to the adoption of the 2012 Statute and the organizational layout which excluded the 11 Faculties in favour of 20 Departments.

At present, the university is divided into 20 Departments, with around 150 first and second level degree courses, and single cycle degree courses, more than 20 doctoral courses, 50 schools of specialisation and more than 60 postgraduate courses. There are more than 1,500 members of teaching staff and a slightly higher number of administrative personnel, technicians, foreign language assistants and librarians. There are around 50,000 students enrolled, and in a city with a population of approximately 90,000 inhabitants, this makes Pisa a true city campus. The students come mainly from Tuscany and Liguria, with a significant intake from many other regions, above all from the south of Italy. A sizeable number of the students are also foreign, contributing to the open, lively, multicultural nature of the city.

Thanks to the traditions and high quality of studies, the vocation for research and innovation, the presence of a system formed by the Scuola Normale Superiore, the Sant’Anna School of Advanced Studies and important research centres, the University of Pisa boasts an excellent reputation both in Italy and in Europe, as can be seen in the various international rankings which place it among the best universities in the world and at the top in Italy.

Among the many graduates of the University of Pisa are the Nobel Prize winners Giosuè Carducci, Enrico Fermi and Carlo Rubbia, holders of the Field Medal for Mathematics, Enrico Bombieri and Alessio Figalli, Presidents of the Republic, Giovanni Gronchi and Carlo Azeglio Ciampi, film directors Mario Monicelli and Paolo and Vittorio Taviani and writers Tiziano Terzani and Antonio Tabucchi. Pisa's most famous graduate in the world today is the tenor Andrea Bocelli.

Organization and administration

The University of Pisa consists of 20 departments. These departments offers several courses in their related field of study:
 Civil and Industrial Engineering
 Economics and Management
 Energy, Systems, Territory and Construction Engineering
 Information Engineering
 Mathematics
 Physics
 Computer Science
 Chemistry and Industrial Chemistry
 Biology
 Earth Sciences
 Clinical and Experimental Medicine
 Surgical, Medical and Molecular Pathology and Critical Care Medicine
 Translational Research on New Technologies in Medicine and Surgery
 Pharmacy
 Humanities Civilisations and Forms of Knowledge
 Philology, Literature and Linguistics
 Law
 Political Science
 Agricultural, Environmental and Food Sciences
 Veterinary Sciences

PhD studies are usually offered and arranged by the departments. The lectures are mostly given in Italian, except for a number of courses at the faculty of foreign languages and literature, some scientific programmes, such as the international MSc in aerospace engineering (EuMAS), Master in Business Informatics, the Master of Science in Space Engineering and the Master in Computer Science and Networking, jointly offered with Scuola Superiore Sant'Anna. Students also have at their disposal a language centre, where they can attend courses in foreign languages, a sports centre (Cus Pisa) that arranges for many sports intramural leagues and allows sports practice in almost all the disciplines available in Italy, and six university refectories (Mense universitarie). The University of Pisa is not organized in the form of one unique campus, but rather its many buildings are scattered throughout the whole Pisa area, especially in the city centre.

Libraries 

The University Library System (Italian: Sistema Bibliotecario di Ateneo, SBA) consists of 15 libraries and the General Archive of the University.

 Polo 1: Agriculture (AGR)
 Polo 1: Economics (ECO)
 Polo 1:Veterinary Medicine (VET)
 Polo 2: Law (IUS)
 Polo 2: Political Science (SPO)
 Polo 3: Chemistry (CHI)
 Polo 3: Mathematics, Computer Science, Physics (MIF)
 Polo 3: Natural and Environmental Sciences (SNA)
 Polo 4: Medicine and Surgery, Pharmacy (MED)
 Polo 5: Engineering (ING)
 Polo 6: English Studies (LM2)
 Polo 6: Ancient Cultures, Linguistic, Germanic and Slavic Studies (ANT)
 Polo 6: Philosophy and History (FIL)
 Polo 6: Italian studies and Romance Philology (LM1)
 Polo 6: History of Arts (STA).

Museums 

The “Museums of University of Pisa” (Italian: Sistema Museale d’Ateneo, SMA) is a network of nine structures in addition to the Natural History Museum which is located in Calci, a few kilometers from Pisa.

 Egyptological Collections “Edda Bresciani”
 Collection of Plaster Casts and Antiquities
 Museum of Pathological Anatomy
 Museum of Human Anatomy “Filippo Civinini”
 Veterinary Anatomy Museum
 Museum of Graphics
 Museum of Computing Machinery
 Museum of Physics Instruments
 Botanic Garden.

Rankings

In 2011, the University of Pisa came in first place among the Italian universities, according to the Academic Ranking of World Universities and within the best 30 universities in Europe.
Times Higher Education World University Rankings ranks University of Pisa among the 350 best world universities.
Times Higher Education Europe Teaching Rankings ranks University of Pisa among the top 100 European Universities for teaching.
QS World University Rankings ranks University of Pisa in the world's top 100 for Computer Science & Information Systems, Physics & Astronomy, Mathematics, Classics & Ancient History, Library & Information Management.
The U.S. News & World Report places the University of Pisa among the world's 300 best universities.
 The European Research Ranking, a ranking based on publicly available data from the European Commission database, puts the University of Pisa among the best in Italy and the best performing European research institutions.

Notable people

Alumni
Notable people who have attended the University of Pisa include:

In politics and government:
 Italian political leaders
 Giacomo Acerbo
 Giuliano Amato
 Sandro Bondi
 Maria Chiara Carrozza
 Carlo Azeglio Ciampi
 Massimo D'Alema
 Giovanni Gronchi
 Guido Buffarini Guidi
 Enrico Letta
 Antonio Maccanico
 Fabio Mussi
 Alessandro Natta
 Marcello Pera
 Enrico Rossi
 Carlo Sforza
 Sidney Sonnino
 Paolo Emilio Taviani
 Foreign political leaders
 Deputy Prime Minister of Albania Spiro Koleka
 Ambassador Marcello Spatafora
 Prime Ministers of Greece Ioannis Kolettis and Diomidis Kyriakos
 Haitian President René Préval
 Nicaraguan President Adan Cardenas
 Prime Minister of Somalia Ali Mohammed Ghedi

In theology: 
 Archbishop Giovanni Battista Rinuccini
 Cardinals
 Benedetto Accolti the Younger
 Pietro Accolti
 Francesco Barberini
 Cesare Borgia
 Giovanni Antonio Guadagni
 Francisco de Remolins
 Francesco Martelli
 Bandino Panciatici
 Raffaele Riario
 Giovanni Battista Tolomei
 Popes
 Clement IX
 Clement XII
 Leo X
 Paul III
 Urban VIII
 Chief Rabbi Elio Toaff
 Minister Angus Morrison

In science:
 Astrophysicists 
 Paolo Farinella
 Franco Pacini
 Viviana Acquaviva
 Biophysicist Clara Franzini-Armstrong
 Botanist Giovanni Arcangeli
 Geneticist Guido Pontecorvo (1907–1999)
 Mathematicians 
 Aldo Andreotti
 Enrico Betti
 Vincenzo Brunacci
 Cesare Burali-Forti
 Bonaventura Cavalieri
 Guglielmo Libri Carucci dalla Sommaja
 Giovanni Ceva
 Luigi Fantappiè
 Alessio Figalli, winner of the 2018 Fields Medal
 Guido Fubini
 Christopher Hacon
 Giuseppe Lauricella
 Salvatore Pincherle
 Ferdinando Pio Rosellini
 Giovanni Salvemini
 Carlo Somigliana
 Vito Volterra
 Guido Zappa
 Neuroscientist Emilio Bizzi
 Physicians
 Vincenzo Chiarugi
 Paolo Macchiarini
 Francesco Redi
 Physicists
 Adolfo Bartoli
 Temistocle Calzecchi-Onesti
 Ennio Candotti
 Nello Carrara
 Enrico Fermi (1901–1954), winner of the 1938 Nobel Prize in Physics
 Galileo Galilei
 Luca Gammaitoni
 Antonio Pacinotti
 Eligio Perucca
 Luigi Puccianti
 Franco Rasetti
 Vasco Ronchi
 Carlo Rubbia (1934–), co-winner of the 1984 Nobel Prize in Physics

In other fields:
 Egyptologists Sergio Donadoni, Edda Bresciani, Gianluca Miniaci and Ippolito Rosellini
 Fashion model Tania Bambaci
 Film directors Mario Monicelli, Paolo Virzì and Simone Rapisarda Casanova
 Historians Carlo Ginzburg, Camillo Porzio, and Mario Rosa
 Librettist Giacinto Andrea Cicognini
 Philologist Gian Biagio Conte
 Philosophers
 Francesco Cattani da Diacceto
 Aldo Gargani
 Giovanni Gentile
 Anna Camaiti Hostert
 Eufrosin Poteca
 Jiyuan Yu
 Physiologist Hugo Kronecker (1839–1914)
 Tenors Andrea Bocelli and Francesco Rasi

Notable people who have attended the University of Pisa include:

 Agronomist Nazareno Strampelli
 Anatomist Atto Tigri 
 Art historian and curator Carolyn Christov-Bakargiev
 Civil engineer Henry Willey Reveley
 Civil servant Bruno Ferrante
 Computer scientists
 Elisa Bertino
 Luca Cardelli
 Roberto Di Cosmo
 Luca Passani
 Diplomat Carlo Andrea Pozzo di Borgo
 Economists Luigi Bodio and Paolo Malanima
 Engineer Giacinto Morera
 Intellectual Adriano Sofri
 International civil servant Francesco Cappè
 Journalists Lando Ferretti and Tiziano Terzani
 Jurists
 Giuseppe Averani
 Piero Calamandrei
 Francesco Carrara
 Antonio Cassese
 Italian Constitutional Court Judge Sabino Cassese
 Giovanni Lami
 Miguel Ángel Arroyo
 Remus Opreanu
 Linguists Stefano Arduini and Luigi Rizzi
 Nobel Laureate in Literature Giosuè Carducci
 Managers Pier Francesco Guarguaglini, Luca Desiata
 Naturalist Gaetano Savi
 Physician François Carlo Antommarchi
 Poets
 Vincenzo da Filicaja
 Giovanni Battista Guarini
 Mauro Nervi
 Psychiatrist Silvano Arieti
 Racing car and engine designer Carlo Chiti
 Surgeon Andrea Vaccá Berlinghieri
 Writers
 Pietro Citati
 Francesco Domenico Guerrazzi
 Margaret King
 Antonio Tabucchi
 Zoologist Enrico Hillyer Giglioli

Faculty and staff
Prominent scholars who have taught at the University of Pisa include:

In science:
 Anatomists Lorenzo Bellini and Marcello Malpighi
 Chemist Robert Schiff
 Computer scientist Egon Börger
 Engineer
Corradino D'Ascanio
Sami Barmada
 Mathematicians
 Eugenio Beltrami
 Enrico Bombieri
 Giovanni Alfonso Borelli
 Sergio Campanato
 Benedetto Castelli
 Corrado De Concini
 Ennio De Giorgi
 Luigi Guido Grandi
 Alessandro Marchetti
 Claudio Procesi
 Leonida Tonelli
 Pathologist Angelo Maffucci
 Physicians Pietro Grocco and Paolo Mascagni
 Physicists
 Bernard H. Lavenda
 Carlo Matteucci
 Roy McWeeny
 Giulio Racah
 Gian-Carlo Wick
 Zoologist Enrica Calabresi

In other fields:
 Economist Giuseppe Toniolo
 Egalitarian Philippe Buonarroti, 18th century utopian socialist, revolutionary, journalist, writer, agitator, and freemason, mainly active in France
 Historians
 Jože Pirjevec, Slovene historian from Italy, one of the most prominent diplomatic historians of the west Balkans region, and member of the Slovenian Academy of Sciences and Arts
 Pasquale Villari
 Journalist Luciano Bianciardi, translator and writer of short stories and novels
 Jurists
 Francesco Accarigi
 Carlo Costamagna
 Bartolus de Saxoferrato
 Baldus de Ubaldis
 Linguist Mauro Cristofani, researcher in Etruscan studies
 Philosophers
 Armando Carlini
 Arnold Davidson
 Dominic of Flanders
 Lorenzo Magalotti, author, diplomat and poet
 Ugo Spirito
 Poets
 Italian-Jewish poet & patriot David Levi
 Valerio Magrelli
 Giovanni Pascoli
 16th-century scholar Girolamo Maggi
 Writer Bernard Comment

In popular culture
The University of Pisa is mentioned in the film Don Juan (1926).
The central character in the TV series My Brilliant Friend (based on the novel by Elena Ferrante) attends and graduated from the university.

See also
 Scuola Normale Superiore di Pisa
 Sant'Anna School of Advanced Studies
 Pisa Charterhouse Natural History Museum
 Pisa University System
 École Normale Supérieure
 Superior Graduate Schools in Italy
 List of Italian universities
 List of medieval universities
 Pisa
 ICoN Interuniversity Consortium for Italian Studies

References

External links

 University of Pisa website 
 MSSE – Master of Science in Space Engineering 
 

 
University
Educational institutions established in the 14th century
1343 establishments in Europe
Universities in Tuscany